Zulily, LLC is an American e-commerce company headquartered in Seattle, Washington and owned by Qurate Retail Group. Its target audience is young mothers interested in brand-name goods for their children. It holds no inventory, instead consolidating shipments of vendor-owned merchandise at its fulfillment centers, or drop shipping directly to customers. Zulily offers different discounts each day. In 2014, half of Zulily's orders came from mobile devices. Sales generally last 72 hours. that sells clothing, footwear, toys, infant gear and home products.

History 
Zulily was founded in 2009 by former Blue Nile executives Mark Vadon and Darrell Cavens after Vadon's wife had become pregnant, and he was overwhelmed by the process of acquiring the supplies they had not been aware of needing. Zulily went live on January 27, 2010, with an initial focus on children's apparel. By the fourth quarter of 2010, Zulily was a cash-flow–positive business.

When Zulily went public in November 2013, the company had 2.6 million active customers and $331 million in revenue. Its initial public offering valued the company at $2.6 billion.

In August 2015, Zulily was purchased by Liberty Interactive's QVC division for $2.4 billion. In September 2017, Zulily launched a private label credit card.

Business model
In 2015, it decreased the number of flash sales, in response to some customers who were overwhelmed by the amount of merchandise from which to select. Retaining customers is a challenge for it: "the flash-sale website is straining to hold on to customers and realizing it may have inundated shoppers with too many deals". Although revenue was up 29% in the first quarter of 2015 compared to the prior year, that was less of a huge increase than the 52% shown for the last quarter of 2014 compared to one year earlier, leading the company to lower its estimate of anticipated revenues in 2015.

Although the web site for the company says they hold no inventory, in 2015 they began to hold some merchandise in warehouses to shorten the time for delivery. The lack of inventory has caused quality control issues including defective merchandise, damaged merchandise, incorrect or incomplete products being sent to customers. The company will issue refunds for shipping paid on the damaged, defective or incorrect merchandise if it was the only item bought, or it will replace the item for free (emailing photos of the issue is helpful). The company is including some established brands in addition to the emerging brands on which it had completely relied.

References

External links

 

2009 establishments in Washington (state)
Companies based in Seattle
American companies established in 2009
Companies formerly listed on the Nasdaq
Deal of the day services
Online retailers of the United States
Retail companies established in 2009
Internet properties established in 2009
2013 initial public offerings
2015 mergers and acquisitions